Splashdown is a water park located at the Tower Park complex near to Poole, Dorset, England.  The park opened in 1990 and was one of the founding attractions at Tower Park.  The park experiences approximately 180,000 visitors a year.

It has 8 indoor water slides which operate all year round and 5 outside rides which operate only during the summer season.  There is also a wet play area and small training pool for children.

Slides 
Splashdown Poole has 13 slides, 8 indoor and 5 outdoor. These are:

Indoor:

Infinity, a short bowl slide from 2002. The slide consists of a short enclosed tube section, followed by a large enclosed bowl element where riders helix in the bowl before losing momentum and falling through a hole in the middle into a  landing pool. The slide has light and sound effects by Intec Systems, and riders are presented with a panel at the start of the slide to choose the type of song played throughout the it. The options are Rock, Pop, Golden Hour, 80's or Pot Luck. The slide  has advertisements from Wave 105.2, for example on the side of the landing pool, of which has small windows under the surface for guests to look through and see riders. While Infinity currently has a black and silver colour scheme, it used to be coloured blue and red.
Dragon’s Lair. This slide starts from behind the tower seen at the front of the park, requiring quests to ascend a staircase inside the tower. Once at the top, they are presented with the start of the slide, consisting of a few green steps and a green bay. Above this is a sign saying: "Our dragon is well fed every morning and is not usually hungry... However-We cannot accept responsibility for any particularly 'tasty' riders... Therefore, for your own safety, we must insist that riders lay flat on their backs with arms folded across their chests (And fingers crossed) Good Luck!" What follows is a fully enclosed slide that is red on the inside, with the same coloured roof, but a yellow base outside. Just before the turnaround, the roof elevates up to allow riders to see a model dragon at the end of it.

Timeline
 1990 - Park opens with 7 original rides
 1996 - Treasure Falls Flume is renamed Black Thunder with added 'thunder and lightning' effects
 1998 - Outside Screamer tower is built, a 15m high tower adding three new flumes: The Screamer, Louisiana Leap and Tennessee Twister
 2002 - The Spacebowl ride is installed inside the main hall and a new 1m deep swimming pool is opened for small children
 2005 - Major re-modelling of the Tower Park complex involved demolition of the large front tower containing the start of the Torpedo Run flume.  A smaller tower has been built and the flume is re-branded the Dragon's Lair, starting lower down with sound and light effects
 2009 - The company acquires the Quaywest water park in Paignton, Devon, re-branding it Splashdown@Quaywest
 2012 - New slide Velocity is added to the outside tower. The company takes over the Monkey Bizness soft play area at Tower Park; it is now operating under the name Lemur Landings

References

Tourist attractions in Poole
Water parks in the United Kingdom
1990 establishments in England